Alhaji Momodo Njie (30 March 1948 – 19 July 2020), also known as Biri Biri, was a Gambian footballer who played as a right winger. He most notably played for Sevilla FC in Spain and Herfølge Boldklub in Denmark. He was also a Gambian international footballer, and is regarded by several as the best Gambian footballer of all time.

Club career
Before his time in Europe, Biri Biri played for Black Diamonds, Phontoms and Augustines in Gambia as well as Mighty Blackpool of Sierra Leone.

Biri Biri was spotted by Danish club B 1901 during a training camp in Gambia in 1972. He left them in 1973 for Spanish team Sevilla FC. He was the first black player to play for Sevilla, and was considered one of their best players. Biri Biri returned to Denmark to play for Herfølge Boldklub in 1980, and in 1981 he signed for Wallidan F.C. back in Gambia, for whom he played until retirement in 1987.

International career
Biri Biri played on multiple occasions for The Gambia's national men's football team, starting as a youth in 1963.

Retirement
Biri Biri was appointed as Deputy Mayor of Banjul after Yahya Jammeh came to power in 1994, a post he had relinquished by 2005. He also worked as the manager of Royal Albert market in the city. In 2000, Jammeh awarded him the Order of Merit, and he was described as The Gambia's "greatest footballer of the last millennium and of all time."

Biri Biri died on 19 July 2020, aged 72, in Dakar, Senegal.

References

External links
 
 

1948 births
2020 deaths
Sportspeople from Banjul
Gambian footballers
Association football wingers
Augustinians FC players
Derby County F.C. players
Wallidan FC players
Sevilla FC players
Herfølge Boldklub players
La Liga players
The Gambia international footballers
Gambian expatriate footballers
Gambian expatriate sportspeople in England
Expatriate footballers in England
Gambian expatriate sportspeople in Spain
Expatriate footballers in Spain
Gambian expatriate sportspeople in Denmark
Expatriate men's footballers in Denmark